The 1986–87 FA Trophy was the eighteenth season of the FA Trophy.

Preliminary round

Ties

First qualifying round

Ties

Replays

2nd replays

Second qualifying round

Ties

Replays

2nd replay

Third qualifying round

Ties

Replays

2nd replay

1st round
The teams that given byes to this round are Altrincham, Enfield, Frickley Athletic, Kidderminster Harriers, Weymouth, Runcorn, Stafford Rangers, Telford United, Kettering Town, Wealdstone, Cheltenham Town, Bath City, Boston United, Barnet, Scarborough, Northwich Victoria, Maidstone United, Dagenham, Welling United, Gateshead, Sutton United, Wycombe Wanderers, Dartford, Marine, Worthing, Bromsgrove Rovers, Bishop Auckland, Chelmsford City, Burton Albion, Yeovil Town, Bishop's Stortford and South Bank.

Ties

Replays

2nd round

Ties

Replays

2nd replay

3rd round

Ties

Replays

2nd replays

3rd replay

4th round

Ties

Replays

Semi finals

First leg

Second leg

Final

Tie

Replay

References

General
 Football Club History Database: FA Trophy 1986−87
 Rothmans Football Yearbook 1987−88

Specific

1986–87 domestic association football cups
League
1986-87